Ptarmigan is the common name of birds of the genus Lagopus

Ptarmigan may also refer to:

Places
 Ptarmigan Peak (Alberta), a peak beside Pika Peak in Banff National Park, Alberta, Canada
 Ptarmigan Island, Qikiqtaaluk Region, Nunavut, Canada
 Ptarmigan Lake (Ontario), Canada
 Ptarmigan Peak (Alaska), a mountain in the Chugach Mountains near Anchorage, Alaska, U.S.
 Ptarmigan Pass (Front Range), a pass on the Continental Divide of the Americas in Rocky Mountain National Park, U.S.
 Ptarmigan Pass (Sawatch Range), a pass between Eagle County and Summit County, Colorado, U.S.
 Ptarmigan Peak Wilderness, Colorado, U.S.
 Ptarmigan Lake (Glacier County, Montana), U.S.
 Ptarmigan Tunnel, a tunnel in Glacier National park, Montana, U.S.
 Ptarmigan Traverse, a hiking trail in the North Cascades, Washington, U.S.

Other uses
 USS Ptarmigan (AM-376)
 Ptarmigan (sternwheeler), a Canadian steamboat
 Ptarmigan Airways, a former Canadian airline now part of First Air
 Ptarmigan, part of the British Armed Forces communications and information systems

See also
 Ptarmigan and Tom Mine, gold mines at Yellowknife, Northwest Territories, Canada
 Ptarmigan Creek Provincial Park and Protected Area, British Columbia, Canada
 Ptarmigan Cirque, Alberta, Canada
 Ptarmigan Lake (disambiguation)
 Ptarmigan Pass (disambiguation)